Santa Cesarea Terme is a town and comune in the province of Lecce,  Apulia, southern Italy.

Situated on the coast at the entrance of the Strait of Otranto, on a part of the coast which comes down to the sea, the town of Santa Cesarea is one of the largest centers for thermal baths in the Salento. The use of the waters, coming from four caves, dates back to the 16th century. The economy of the whole town is based on the baths, which offer various facilities.

References

External links
  Santa Cesarea Terme Guide
 Pronunciation of Santa Cesarea
 Santa Cesarea Terme holiday homes, in Italy

Cities and towns in Apulia
Localities of Salento